Christopher Paul Maskery (born 25 September 1964) is an English former footballer who played in the Football League for Stoke City.

Maskery played for Stoke City from 1982 to 1987 where he made 107 appearances scoring five goals. His career was ended after he swallowed his tongue whilst playing for Stafford Rangers.

Career
Maskery was born in Stoke-on-Trent and played for the youth team of his local club Stoke City turning professional in 1982. He made his debut away at Coventry City in December 1982. He forced his way into the first team in 1983–84 and was a regular in 1984–85 playing in 36 matches. Stoke however suffered an awful season being relegated with a record low points tally of 17. Under new manager Mick Mills Maskery was first choice in midfield but injury against Sunderland at the end of November 1985 meant he missed the rest of the 1985–86 season.

He made sporadic appearances in 1986–87 and was not offered a new contract by Mills at the end of the campaign. Instead of joining another League side Maskery retired but he stayed local and made a U-turn and joined Stafford Rangers. However, in 1990 he swallowed his tongue during a Rangers match and decided to retire from football again. He went on to join the Staffordshire Fire service.

Career statistics

A.  The "Other" column constitutes appearances and goals in the Full Members Cup.

References

English footballers
Stoke City F.C. players
Stafford Rangers F.C. players
English Football League players
1964 births
Living people
Association football midfielders